Pseudorhamnocercoides is a genus of monogeneans in the family Diplectanidae. The genus is monospecific, containing the single species Pseudorhamnocercoides stichospinus.

Etymology
The generic name refers "to the several misidentifications of the single species of the new genus as Rhamnocercoides".

References

Diplectanidae
Monogenea genera
Parasites of fish
Monotypic platyhelminthes genera